Ambohimanga Rova is a rural commune in Analamanga Region, in the Central Highlands of Madagascar. It belongs to the district of Antananarivo Avaradrano and its populations numbers to 20,872 in 2018.

It is situated at 27 km North-West from Antananarivo.

Roads
The town is crossed by the National Road 51.

Economy
The economy is based on agriculture.  Rice, corn, peanuts, beans, manioc, soja and oignons are the main crops.
Another important factor is tourism. The royal hill of Ambohimanga is situated in this commune and is a popular point of interest.

References

Analyse territoriale dans l’optique du developpement durable,cas de la commune rurale d’Ambohimanga Rova

External links

Populated places in Analamanga